I'll Get Back to Kandara (French: Je reviendrai à Kandara) is a 1956 French drama film directed by  Victor Vicas and starring  François Périer, Daniel Gélin and Bella Darvi.

The film's art direction was by Raymond Gabutti.

Cast
    François Périer as André Barret  
 Daniel Gélin  as Bernard Cormière 
 Bella Darvi  as Pascale Barret  
 Jean Brochard  as Le juge d'instruction  
 Julien Carette  as Grindel  
 André Valmy as Rudeau  
 Julien Verdier as Lachaume  
 Guy Tréjan as Pélissier  
 François Darbon  as Le commissaire  
 Madeleine Barbulée  as Madame Lachaume  
 Gisèle Grimm  as Henriette  
 Colette Régis  as Madame Bergamier - la belle-mère  
 Edmond Ardisson as Le buraliste 
 Claude Carrère  as L'interne  
 Max Dalban  as Le porteur de journaux  
 Robert Dalban  as Cardelec  
 Émile Genevois as Le garçon de café  
 Marcel Pérès as L'agent  
 Léon Larive  as L'employé de la consigne  
 Susi Jera  as Josette 
 René Alié  
 Claudine Bleuse  
 Claude Bouillaud  as Ravaud  
 Claudy Chapeland  
 Henri Coutet  
 Patrick Dewaere  as Le petit garçon  
 Édouard Francomme  
 Lucien Guervil  
 René Hell  
 Robert Le Fort  as L'ouvrier au commissariat  
 Héléna Manson  
 Yves-Marie Maurin as Un élève  
 Daniel Mendaille  
 Jacques Monod 
 Louise Nowa 
 Jean Olivier  
 Marcel Rouzé  
 Louis Saintève  
 Roger Vincent  
 Suzy Willy

References

Bibliography 
 Rège, Philippe. Encyclopedia of French Film Directors, Volume 1. Scarecrow Press, 2009.

External links 
 

1956 films
1956 drama films
French drama films
1950s French-language films
Films directed by Victor Vicas
Films scored by Joseph Kosma
1950s French films